A Honeymoon Adventure is a 1931 British thriller film directed by Maurice Elvey and starring Benita Hume, Peter Hannen and Harold Huth. Written in collaboration by Rupert Downing and Basil Dean, it  The film was shot at Beaconsfield Studios. Location shooting, including the railway scenes took place in Scotland.

Plot
On the wedding day of Peter Martin (Peter Hannen), a brilliant scientist, and Eve Harvey (Benita Hume), Walter Creason (Harold Huth), an agent of a foreign power, learns that Peter has designed a revolutionary electric storage battery and taken the plans and specifications to Scotland to look over on his honeymoon. Creason plots to attend the wedding and follows the couple on their honeymoon in an attempt to discover and steal the plans. 

Peter receives a telegram from his father-in-law instructing him to return by express train with his plans for an upcoming government conference. Sensing the urgency, he declares that he must return at once, to Eva's dismay. 

Whilst travelling on the train, Peter is drugged and taken back to his cabin by a man who proceeds to search his case for the documents. When he regains consciousness the next morning he finds himself held at gunpoint in a run-down apartment. The man, Judson (Walter Armitage) realises that Peter had not brought the papers with him and instructs him to telegram his wife to tell her he will be returning later than expected. 

With Peter detailed by his accomplice, Creason arrives at their honeymoon location, a large Scottish castle, masquerading as a friend of her husband's who was expecting to meet him. Eve offers him a room for the night. They dine together and after dinner Creason notices with interest a safe hidden in the wall. Peter's telegram then arrives and Eve grows suspicious of the stranger who becomes increasingly boorish. Later that night Creason searches for more hidden compartments, attempting to find the battery plans. Eve follows and manages to claim the documents, deceiving Creason in the process. 

The following morning Creason tells Eve he has keys to the safe which he claims her husband gave him to collect the important documents. The safe is opened but Creason realises the drawings are missing, growing suspicious that Eve is hiding them. With the assistance of the castle's chauffeur (Jack Lambert), Eve evades the criminals who eventually track her to a steam train travelling from Scotland to Euston station in London. Judson pursues her through the city streets, proposing she give him the papers in return for her husband's location, which she refuses. Eve sends a friend out in her distinctive coat, tricking him into following the wrong woman. 

In the meantime Peter starts a fire in his room, forcing the landlady to unlock the door. He then fights his way out of the building, making an escape from the criminals. Peter returns to his home where he is overjoyed to discover Eve. Creason then enters the house and threatens Peter at gunpoint to handover the documents. A fight ensues and Judson enters the fray. Just in time a policeman enters and stops the attack, apprehending the crooks.

Cast
 Benita Hume as Eve Martin 
 Peter Hannen as Peter Martin 
 Harold Huth as Walter Creason 
 Walter Armitage as Judson 
 Jack Lambert as Chauffeur 
 Polly Emery as Old Woman 
 Robert English as Mr Harvey 
 Margery Binner as Josephine 
 Frances Ross Campbell as Janet 
 Fanny Wright as Old Woman

Production
Production began in May 1931, with studio filming conducted in Beaconsfield as the modern Ealing Studios were currently under construction. In June 1931 production moved to a location shoot in Scotland including footage taken at Dalcross Castle, the home of  C. Frazer-Simpson, the author of the story. The second day's shooting was supposed to take place at Dulsie Bridge, but weather was poor. Avenmore Junction was used for the third days' shooting, where a special train was hired.

The author of the novel on which the film was adapted was Cicely Fraser-Simson. She was the second wife of English composer Harold Fraser-Simson, noted for his many works of light music including musical comedies and setting children poems to music, especially those of A. A. Milne. One of his pieces, "Waltz Song" was featured in the film and his name appears in the credits. 

A Honeymoon Adventure was produced as 'Footsteps in the Night' which was the title of the original novel on which the film was based. The title change was announced just one day before the film premiere. 

Lead actress Benita Hume's dresses were designed by the leading Paris-based British fashion designer Edward Molyneux.

References

Bibliography
 Low, Rachel. History of British Film: Volume VII, 1929-1939. Routledge, 1997

External links

1931 films
British thriller films
1930s thriller films
1930s English-language films
Films directed by Maurice Elvey
Associated Talking Pictures
Films shot at Beaconsfield Studios
Films based on British novels
Films shot in Scotland
Films set in Scotland
Films set in London
British black-and-white films
Films with screenplays by John Paddy Carstairs
Films about scientists
1930s British films